There are 111 properties and historic districts on the National Register of Historic Places in Worcester, Massachusetts, west of I-190 and the north–south section of I-290 and north of Massachusetts Route 122, which are listed here.  Two listings overlap into other parts of Worcester: one of the 1767 Milestones is located in eastern Worcester, and the Blackstone Canal Historic District traverses all three sections of the city.

The locations of National Register properties and districts (at least for all showing latitude and longitude coordinates below) may be seen in an online map by clicking on "Map of all coordinates".

Current listings

|}

Former listing

|}

See also
National Register of Historic Places listings in Worcester, Massachusetts
National Register of Historic Places listings in southwestern Worcester, Massachusetts
National Register of Historic Places listings in eastern Worcester, Massachusetts
National Register of Historic Places listings in Worcester County, Massachusetts

Notes

References

History of Worcester, Massachusetts
NRHP Northwest
Northwest